Özlem Yasemin Taşkın (born October 28, 1985) is a Turkish former swimmer, who specialized in long-distance freestyle events. She is a five-time Turkish champion in the 200 and 400 m freestyle, and a member of Galatasaray Swimming Team, under her coach Yılmaz Özüak.

Taskin qualified for the women's 400 m freestyle at the 2004 Summer Olympics in Athens. She eclipsed a FINA B-standard entry time of 4:23.69 from the Turkish Open Championships in Izmir. She challenged five other swimmers on the first heat, including two-time Olympians Pilin Tachakittiranan of Thailand and Ivanka Moralieva of Bulgaria. She raced to fourth place by 0.46 of a second behind Tachakittiranan in 4:24.08. Parshina failed to reach into the top 8 final, as she placed thirty-fifth overall in the preliminaries.

References

1985 births
Living people
Turkish female swimmers
Olympic swimmers of Turkey
Swimmers at the 2004 Summer Olympics
Turkish female freestyle swimmers
Galatasaray Swimming swimmers
21st-century Turkish sportswomen